Melodic Rock EP is and EP released by the hard rock band Harem Scarem that was only available for purchase from the melodicrock.com website. It was intended for the fans as a "make-up" for the band missing the MelodicRock festival. It was originally only available as a digital download, but has since been available on physical CDs from the melodicrock.com website.  The recording is the band performing a few songs in an acoustical format.

Track listing

Band
Harry Hess - lead vocals, guitar, producer
Pete Lesperance - lead guitar, backing vocals, producer
Barry Donaghy - bass, backing vocals
Creighton Doane - drums, backing vocals

2008 EPs
Harem Scarem albums